Sdarot Is a streaming media website that publishes content from Israel and from across the world. As of March 2022, Sdarot is the biggest online streaming website in Israel, with over 1.3 billion views across all its content.

History 
The site was established in January 2011 and began to provide pirated content with built-in Hebrew subtitles, with their goal being "making TV series accessible for all the population, without the need to pay huge amounts of money to TV corporations".

During the years of its operation, the site changed its address several times following their battle against the copyright infringement "Zira", which they call "Ziba" (from the word: זיבי, Zibi, a slang insult in Hebrew). The site's has an application too that bypasses DNS blocking with a built-in VPN.

On 11 March 2021, The site fell due to a fire that broke out at a server farm in France where some of the company's servers were stored. The site was back online after two days.

At the end of 2021, according to the site's statistics, the site crossed one billion views across all its content.

Website "SRATIM" 
Sratim is also a streaming media website that publies content, but instead of TV series, "SRATIM" website publishes movies. The pirated movies on the site have Hebrew subtitles on them.

Website activity 
The site allows people to view its content from multiple servers, but there is also a purchase option that allows people to watch the series without from a special server without waiting 30 seconds. The site also had a forum that was closed in 2020. The site is operated by 100 volunteers.

Legal battle 
Various organizations, including Zira, are trying to close the website due to copyright infringement for years. In 2016, a blocking order was issued, and Internet providers began blocking access to the site's domain. However, despite the order, the site continues to operate on new or different domains, and most people in Israel access the site by changing their DNS to 1.1.1.1 or by VPN. In January 2017, Facebook blocked the page of the site that had 77,000 followers, and on 17 February 2022, their Instagram and Telegram pages were blocked as well.

The closure order was issued again in January 2020, and Israeli ISPs blocked access to the site's domain at the DNS level again. As of January 2020, a lawsuit is being filed against the site.

In May 2022, the United States District Court for the Southern District of New York ruled that Sdarot TV and two other websites were providing illegal service, and ordered US ISPs to block access to them.

References 

Streaming television